Floyds Fork is a  tributary of the Salt River in Kentucky, directly south and east of Louisville. It begins in Henry County, near Smithfield Kentucky, flows through eastern Jefferson County and flows into the Salt River near Shepherdsville in Bullitt County.

It is also the least environmentally compromised watershed in the county, according to the Metropolitan Sewer District, as large-scale development in the southeastern portions of Jefferson County is still relatively sparse. To preserve its rural character, much of Floyds Fork south of I-64 was zoned rural residential in 1993.

At Mount Washington, Floyds Fork has a discharge of approximately 387 cubic feet per second.

The proposed City of Parks initiative by Louisville would purchase  of land along the river and establish three to four parks, as well as hiking and other recreational trails.

Floyds Fork is named for John Floyd, an early surveyor of the area. During the Civil War, Confederate and Union forces skirmished on Floyds Fork and what is now US 60 (Shelbyville Road, locally) on October 1, 1862.

The Parklands of Floyds Fork

  Beckley Creek Park  – , encompassing the existing Miles Park at Shelbyville Rd. and stretching to South English Station and Echo Trail. A major highlight of the park is the 22-acre great-lawn, that is encircled by a walking path and park drive, and named the "Egg Lawn", which gets its name from its shape. It has excellent wooded and groomed trails for running and biking. A picturesque setting for any family outing as well.
  Turkey Run Park  – , stretching  from Seatonville Road to Broad Run Rd.
  Broad Run Park  – , south of Turkey Run Park and stretching south to Bardstown Rd.

A  narrow strip of connecting land between Pope Lick Park and Turkey Run Park, called "The Strand", will encompass another .

Turkey Run will be the city's second-largest park, behind the Jefferson Memorial Forest.

The Parklands of Floyds Fork are operated by Louisville nonprofit, 21st Century Parks. The new park system relies on donor-support, memberships, and an endowment for annual operations.

In recent years, the area surrounding Floyds Fork has been subject to new property development. In order to protect the tributary from developers, the Future Fund has purchased 115 acres of land, which were otherwise going to become a subdivision. The aim of this organisation is to preserve the creek by making sure it is only being used for recreation, reducing private development to a minimum.

See also
 List of rivers of Kentucky
 City of Parks
 Geography of Louisville, Kentucky
 List of attractions and events in the Louisville metropolitan area
 List of parks in the Louisville metropolitan area

References

External links
 The Parklands of Floyds Fork—Website
21st Century Parks—Website
      

 Construction Begins on the next $15 Million Phase of Beckley Creek Park and Pope Lick Park—Louisville.gov June 27, 2012
 Bridges Progressing At The Parklands of Floyds Fork – BrokenSidewalk  January 2012
 Beckley Creek Park to be first phase of $113 million project—May 2011
 Thorntons Inc. pledges $1 million for Parklands—November 2010
 Parklands to build a $1 million PNC education center—October 2010
 Construction begins on Parklands of Floyds Fork – August 2010
Floyds Fork Parks Get $10 Million Boost—August 2010
New park system named Parklands of Floyds Fork—August 2010
Watershed information from MSD
Floyds Fork Environmental Association
Floyds Fork Auto Tour
Fisherville, KY - Our Piece of Pie!

Rivers of Kentucky
Landforms of Louisville, Kentucky
Landforms of Oldham County, Kentucky
Landforms of Bullitt County, Kentucky
Salt River (Kentucky)